Revisited is a 1960 studio album by American singer Eartha Kitt, her second album issued on the Kapp Records label. All songs had been previously recorded by Kitt, between 1953 and 1958, during her recording contract at RCA Victor. Recorded in New York on March 31 and April 1, 1960, with Maurice Levine as musical director. The album was also released as four track, 7-inch EP in the United Kingdom and France.

The complete album was re-issued on CD in 1994 as part of the Bear Family Records five CD boxset Eartha - Quake, this included a previously unreleased bonus track, "Johnny with the Gentle Hands", from the same recording session. The album was also released to CD by Hallmark Music & Entertainment in 2012 as a stand-alone album.

The album charted in the UK at #17 in February 1961.

Track listing

12" LP version
"(If I Love Ya, Then I Need Ya) I Wantcha Around" (Bob Merrill) - 2:25
"Uska Dara (A Turkish tale)" (Traditional) - 3:37
"Let's Do It" (Cole Porter) - 2:38
"Angelitos Negros" (Andrés Eloy Blanco, Manuel Alvarez Maciste) - 3:27
"Apres Moi" (Bernard Bennett) - 3:25
"C'est si bon" (Henri Betti, André Hornez) - 2:35
"Just an Old Fashioned Girl" (Marve Fisher) - 2:44
"April In Portugal" (Raul Ferrão, Jimmy Kennedy) - 2:35
"I Want to Be Evil" (Lester Judson, Raymond Taylor) - 2:57
"My Heart Belongs to Daddy" (Cole Porter) - 2:47
"Lilac Wine" (James Shelton) - 3:30
"Santa Baby" (Joan Javits, Philip Springer) - 2:47

Eartha - Quake CD bonus tracks
"Johnny With the Gentle Hands" (Take 7) (George Siravo, Kermit Goell)
"Johnny With the Gentle Hands" (Take 8) (George Siravo, Kermit Goell)

7" EP version
"My Heart Belongs to Daddy" (Cole Porter) - 2:47
"I Wantcha Round" (Bob Merrill) - 2:25
"C'est Si Bon" (Henri Betti, André Hornez) - 2:35
"Angelitos Negros"(Andrés Eloy Blanco, Manuel Alvarez Maciste) - 3:27

Personnel
Technical
Maurice Levine – arranger and Musical Director
Performance
Eartha Kitt – vocals

Release history

References

Eartha Kitt albums
Kapp Records albums
1960 albums